Sacred Ground may refer to:
 A sacred site, an area considered sacred or holy

Music 
 Sacred Ground (David Murray album), or the title song, 2007
 Sacred Ground (McBride & the Ride album), or the title song (see below), 1992
 Sacred Ground (Whit Dickey album), 2006
 Sacred Ground: A Tribute to Mother Earth, a 2005 compilation album of Native American music
 "Sacred Ground" (song), a 1989 song by Kix Brooks, also covered by McBride & the Ride

Other media 
 Sacred Ground (film), a 1983 American Western starring Tim McIntire and Jack Elam
 Sacred Ground (novel), a 1995 novel by Mercedes Lackey
 "Sacred Ground" (Star Trek: Voyager), a 1996 episode of Star Trek: Voyager